The 2010–11 Purdue Boilermakers men's basketball team represented Purdue University. The head coach was Matt Painter, in his sixth season with the Boilers. The team played its home games in Mackey Arena in West Lafayette, Indiana, and was a member of the Big Ten Conference.

Purdue finished the season 26–8, 14–4 in Big Ten play to finish in second place. As the No. 2 seed in the Big Ten tournament, they lost to Michigan State in the quarterfinals. They received a bid to the NCAA tournament as No. 3 seed in the Southwest Region. They defeated Saint Peter's in the Second Round before losing to eventual Final Four participant VCU in the Third Round.

Season notes
 After initially entering their names into the 2010 NBA draft, both E'Twaun Moore and JaJuan Johnson removed their names from consideration on May 8, 2010, and announced their intentions to return for their senior seasons.
 On October 4, 2010, Robbie Hummel, Moore, and Johnson were named to the John R. Wooden Award Pre-Season watch list.  Purdue was the only school with three individuals recognized on the list of 50 possible candidates.
 On October 16, Hummel re-tore the same ACL that he had injured the previous season during team practice and will miss the season. Hummel has stated that he plans to take a medical redshirt and prepare for the 2011–12 season.
 Johnson was named a Preseason First-Team All-American by the Associated Press and ESPN.
 Both Moore and Johnson were named to the Preseason First-Team All-Big Ten Team.
 Junior John Hart received a fracture in his foot in early December. He returned against  West Virginia on January 16.
 E'Twaun Moore became the program's career record holder for minutes played, three point field goals made, and most starts. 
 E'Twaun Moore scored a career high 38 points against Ohio State, the most points in a game by a Boiler since Glenn Robinson in 1994.
 E'Twaun Moore scored his 2,000th career point against Ohio State on February 20, 2011. 
 JaJuan Johnson scored a career high 31 points against Indiana State.
 E'Twaun Moore made a career high 7 three-point field goals multiple times against Northwestern and Ohio State.
 Junior Ryne Smith was named Big Ten Co-Player of the Week, averaging 19 points and shooting 11–14 beyond the arc in wins against Penn State and Iowa.
 JaJuan Johnson was named a Sporting News Midseason First-Team All-American
 Purdue defeated back-to-back top ten teams at home for the first time in school history (#10 Wisconsin, #2 Ohio State)
 JaJuan Johnson tied a career high 7 blocks against Michigan State on February 27, 2011. In the same contest, he tallied a career high 17 rebounds. 
 Purdue went undefeated at home, going 16–0, for the first time since the 1968–1969 season.
 At the conclusion of the regular season, JaJuan Johnson was named the Big Ten Conference Player of the Year, as well as the Big Ten Conference Defensive Player of the Year. 
 Matt Painter was named consecutive Big Ten Conference Coach of the Year honors. 
 E'Twaun Moore was named First Team-All Big Ten for consecutive seasons.
 Kelsey Barlow was suspended on March 15, three days before the Boilermakers played their second-round game against St. Peter's.

Roster

Incoming recruits

Schedule and results 

|-
!colspan=9 style=| Exhibition
|-

|-
!colspan=9 style=| Regular season
|-

|-
!colspan=9 style=|Big Ten tournament
|-

|-
!colspan=9 style=|NCAA tournament

|-

Rankings

2011 Signing Class 
The 2011 recruiting class was weak compared to Purdue's recent history recruiting. The class brought in two power forwards. Donnie Hale was ranked the #25 power forward in this recruiting class. Hale committed to Purdue June 23, 2009. He transferred his sophomore year to the Bellarmine Knights. Jacob Lawson was the #31 ranked power forward. He committed to Purdue on April 28, 2011.

See also
2011 NCAA Division I men's basketball tournament
2010-11 NCAA Division I men's basketball season
2010-11 NCAA Division I men's basketball rankings
List of NCAA Division I institutions

References

Purdue
Purdue Boilermakers men's basketball seasons
Purdue
Purd
Purd